Whiteman Fork is a stream in the U.S. state of West Virginia.

Whiteman Fork was named from an incident when a white man was killed who was masquerading as an Indian.

See also
List of rivers of West Virginia

References

Rivers of Kanawha County, West Virginia
Rivers of West Virginia